Morandi was a Romanian eurodance music group composed of Randi (Andrei Ropcea) and Marius Moga.

Career

2004–2005: Career beginnings and Reverse
The duo was formed in September 2004 by Marius Moga and Randi and released their debut single "Love Me" in November of that year. Their debut album, Reverse was released on 17 July 2005 and received a gold certification from the UPFR in December. As of December 2021, the album has sold two million copies worldwide. "Beijo (Uh La La)", which served as the second single from the album, topped the Romanian Top 100 for nine weeks.

2006–2008: Mind Fields and N3XT
The duo expanded and became a group, adding a percussionist and two disc jockeys. Mindfields, the group's second album, was released in March 2006. Two singles were promoted off the album, "Falling Asleep" and "A la lujeba", both reaching number one in Romania. In July 2007, the group released the lead single off their third album, titled "Afrika", which peaked at number two in Romania. "Angels (Love Is the Answer)" was a commercial success, reaching number one in five countries and being certified seven times platinum in Russia. Their third album, N3XT, was released on 14 December 2007, and received a platinum certification in Romania and was certified four times platinum in Russia. "Save Me" featuring Helene served as the last single off the album, attaining similar success to the previous single.

2009–2011: Zebra
In June 2009, the duo announced "Colors" as the lead single off their upcoming fourth album, titled Zebra, which was due for release later that year. "Rock the World" was released as the second single from the album in April 2010, with the duo acknowledging the album's delay. Two more singles were released to promote the album in 2011, specifically "Midnight Train" and "Serenada". In an interview with Urban.ro, Randi stated that Morandi will take a hiatus, and that the album was due for release in December 2011.

2012–2021: Hiatus and single releases
The duo returned to the music scene in 2013 with "Everytime We Touch". They proceeded to release two more singles before taking another hiatus at the end of 2014. In November 2016, Morandi came back by releasing "Keep You Safe". The singles "Kalinka" and "Professional Liar", were announced to be released as the first and second lead singles, respectively, off the group's upcoming fourth album. By June 2021, Randi was confirmed to no longer be part of the duo and in May 2022, it was declared that the two parted ways.

Discography

Studio albums

Compilations

Singles

Awards and nominations

Member timeline

Notes

References

Romanian pop music groups
Musical groups established in 2004
Musical groups disestablished in 2021
Europop groups
MTV Europe Music Award winners
2004 establishments in Romania
2021 disestablishments in Romania